The NASCAR playoffs (formerly officially known as the Chase for the Nextel/Sprint Cup from 2004 to 2016)  is a championship playoff system used in NASCAR's three national series. The system was founded as 'The Chase for the Championship' on January 21, 2004, and was used exclusively in the NASCAR Cup Series from 2004 to 2015. Since 2016, NASCAR has also used the playoff system in the Xfinity Series and Camping World Truck Series.

The NASCAR Cup Series version of the playoff system is often called the Chase for the Cup based on it's former official name, and includes sixteen drivers that compete for the championship in the final ten races of the Cup Series. The first nine races are divided into three rounds, with four participants being eliminated after each round (with the exception of the final round where the Cup Series champion is decided). The Xfinity Series Playoff format is competed over seven races with twelve drivers and three rounds with four drivers also being eliminated each round (with the exception of the final round where the Xfinity series champion is decided). The Truck Series Playoff also is seven races long, but only includes ten drivers with 2 drivers being eliminated in the first round and 4 drivers being eliminated in the second round and the champion being decided in the third and final round.

On January 23, 2017, NASCAR announced that they end it's use of the word "chase,” instead using the word "playoffs" to refer to the system. In 2018 NASCAR began awarding a regular season championship for the driver with the most points heading into the playoffs in all three series and grandfathered 2017 as the first time the regular season championship was awarded into the record books.

Origins of the playoffs
The publicly stated purpose for the NASCAR playoff system was to make the NASCAR mid-season more competitive, and increase fan interest and television ratings. The timing of the start of the playoff coincides with the commencement of the college and National Football League seasons and the final month of Major League Baseball's regular season and Major League Baseball's Playoffs. Prior to this format, the Cup champion was sometimes determined mathematically prior to the season finale, a situation that continued to exist in the lower-tier series, the Xfinity Series and Camping World Truck Series, until they received their own playoff formats in 2016.

By resetting and compressing the scoring of the top 10 (later 12, then 16) drivers, the chances of each of those drivers winning the championship was increased, while not precluding anyone with a legitimate chance of winning. The original choice of top 10 drivers was based on the historical analysis that no driver outside the top 10, with 10 races remaining in the season, had ever gone on to win the Championship.  The expansion to top 16 in 2014 made the elimination rounds possible.

Short track racing, the grassroots of NASCAR, began experimenting with ideas to help the entry-level racer. In 2001, the United Speed Alliance Racing organization, sanctioning body of the USAR Hooters Pro Cup Series, a short-track stock car touring series, devised a five-race system where the top teams in their Hooters ProCup North and Hooters ProCup South divisions would participate in a five-race playoff, the Four Champions, named for the four Hooters Racing staff members (including 1992 NASCAR Winston Cup Series champion and pilot Alan Kulwicki) killed in an April 1, 1993 plane crash in Blountville, Tennessee. The system organized the teams with starting points based on the team's performance in their division (division champions earn a bonus), and the teams would participate in a five-race playoff. The five races, added to the team's seeding points, would determine the winner. The 2001 version was four races, as one was canceled because of the September 11 terrorist attacks, however, NASCAR watched as the ProCup's Four Champions became a success and drivers from the series began looking at NASCAR rides. The idea was to give NASCAR, which was becoming in many areas the fourth-largest sport (after Major League Baseball, the NFL, the NBA and surpassing in some regions the NHL) attention during baseball's road to the World Series and the outset of the pro and college football, NHL and NBA seasons.

"The Matt Kenseth rule"

The playoff system has been referred to as "the Matt Kenseth Rule" as a result of Kenseth's championship in 2003, the year prior to NASCAR adopting the playoff system. In 2003, Kenseth won the championship with just one race win (the third race of the year, at Las Vegas Motor Speedway) along with 25 top-ten finishes with him leading the championship for 33 races throughout the season, while also being perceived as having a clean, unexciting. and boring personality around this time. Ryan Newman won eight races that year (22% of the 36 races run in 2003), but failed to finish several races due to crashes and ended the season sixth in the drivers' championship. NASCAR indicated that the 2003 championship outcome was not the driving factor in establishing the playoffs, as they had been considering adjustments to the points system to put more emphasis on winning races since 2000. "The Matt Kenseth Rule" more properly refers to the NASCAR numerical scoring system that was also implemented for the 2004 season, which increased the points awarded to race winners, thus emphasizing winning more and consistency less than in previous years. However, the coincidence of new playoff system in 2004 and Kenseth's 2003 championship led to the issues being linked, including by NASCAR officials in interviews and press releases.

Cup Series
The playoffs system was announced on January 21, 2004, as the "Chase for the Championship,” and first used during the 2004 Nextel Cup season. The format used from 2004 to 2006 was modified slightly starting with the 2007 season. A major change to the qualifying criteria was instituted in 2011, along with a major change to the points system. Even more radical changes to the qualifying criteria, and to the format of the playoffs itself, were announced for the 2014 Sprint Cup Series. As of 2014, the 10-race playoff format involved 16 drivers chosen primarily on wins during the "regular season,” if fewer than 16 drivers won races during the regular season, the remaining field was filled on the basis of regular season points. These drivers competed against each other while racing in the standard field of 40 cars. The driver with the most points after the final 10 races was declared the champion.

Beginning with the 2008 Sprint Cup Series, the playoffs became known by its new name as a result of the merger of Nextel Communications with Sprint Corporation. From 2004 to 2006 some races aired on TNT, with the rest airing on NBC. From 2007 to 2009 all 10 races aired on ABC, but in 2010 NASCAR and ESPN quietly moved 9 of the 10 races to ESPN. In 2015 coverage returned to NBC with some races airing on NBCSN.

Seeding and scoring history
The current version of the playoff system was announced by NASCAR chairman and CEO Brian France on January 23, 2017. The current format is the fifth since it was introduced for the 2004 season, with significant changes made in both 2007 and 2011. The 2017 change is the 15th time since 1949 that the point system had been changed, these latest changes affect both the race format and the playoff seeding.

2004–2006
Starting in the 2004 season, after the first 26 races of the season, all drivers in the Top 10 and any others within 400 points of the leader earned a berth in the chase. All drivers in the chase had their point total adjusted. The first-place driver in the standings began the chase with 5,050 points, the second-place driver started with 5,045, etc. Incremental five-point drops continued through the list of title contenders.

2007–2010
In 2007, NASCAR expanded the field of contenders to the top 12 drivers in the points standings after the first 26 races. Each drivers' point total reset to 5,000 points, with a ten-point bonus for each race won. The provision admitting all drivers within 400 points of the leader into the chase was dropped. Brian France explained why NASCAR made the changes to the chase:
"The adjustments taken [Monday] put a greater emphasis on winning races. Winning is what this sport is all about. Nobody likes to see drivers content to finish in the top 10. We want our sport – especially during the Chase – to be more about winning."

2011–2013
The chase format was again modified for the 2011 season, as was the point system for winnings. After 26 "regular season" races, the top 10 drivers, as determined by points accumulated during the season, automatically advance to contend for the Cup championship. These drivers were joined by two "wild card" qualifiers, specifically the two drivers ranked from 11th through 20th in drivers' points who have the most regular-season race wins. The 12 drivers' championship points were reset to a base of 2,000 per driver. Each of the 10 automatic qualifiers received a bonus of 3 points for each win during the regular season, while the two wild card qualifiers received no bonus. Normal scoring applied during the chase, with race winners earning 43 base points plus 3 bonus points, all drivers who lead a lap earning 1 bonus point, and the driver who led the most laps earning 1 bonus point in addition to any other points earned.

As in all previous chases, the driver with the highest point total at the conclusion of the 10-race chase was the NASCAR Cup Series champion.

The chase field consisted of 12 drivers from 2007 through 2012. An exception to this rule was in 2013, where the chase field was expanded to 13 drivers for that season only as the result of a match fixing scandal. With seven laps remaining in the Federated Auto Parts 400 at Richmond International Raceway, Clint Bowyer went into a spin, forcing a caution. After the race, rumors abounded that Bowyer had deliberately forced a caution in an attempt to manipulate the finish of the race so as to help his Michael Waltrip Racing (MWR) teammate Martin Truex Jr. clinch the second of the two wild card spots (Kasey Kahne had already clinched the first spot) over Ryan Newman, who had been leading at the moment of caution. That Bowyer's spin had been deliberate had been further suggested by several things: the first was radio communications on Brian Vickers' team with his spotter, MWR general manager Ty Norris, telling him to pit under green on the restart, and that the audio on Bowyer's radio showed crew chief Brian Pattie pointing out Newman taking the lead and then asking a suspicious string of questions mere seconds before Bowyer spun. Furthermore, when interviewed by Dr. Jerry Punch post-race, Dale Earnhardt Jr., who was directly behind Bowyer, said that Bowyer "just spun out. It was the craziest thing I saw," and that the behavior of Bowyer's car was inconsistent with Bowyer's claim that a right front tire blew out (the popping noise associated with a flat tire was not heard until after the spin). Vickers' pitting on the restart forced Newman to the back of the pitting cycle, costing him several positions. He ended up finishing third to Carl Edwards and Kurt Busch. By finishing third, Newman was tied with Truex in both wins (one) and final points for the second Wildcard spot. Truex won the tiebreaker on top-five finishes.

The following Monday, September 9, NASCAR issued some of the most severe penalties imposed on a team in NASCAR Cup Series history. MWR was placed on probation for the rest of the season, and Norris was suspended indefinitely.  All three MWR teams were docked 50 owner/driver points for "actions detrimental to stock car racing." As this penalty was applied to pre-chase point totals, it knocked Truex out of the Wildcard spot and put Newman in his place.  NASCAR was unable to find solid evidence that Bowyer's spin was deliberate, but did determine that Norris's order to have Vickers pit was a deliberate attempt to manipulate the chase standings in Truex's favor. Had the ruse not happened, Newman was on point to win the race, automatically becoming the second wild card and bumping Truex.

The ruse also resulted in a second controversy when radio transmissions were discovered suggesting that Front Row Motorsports and Penske Racing had struck a deal for David Gilliland to give up a spot on the track for Joey Logano, allowing Logano to race his way into the final lock-in position by one point over Jeff Gordon. A second NASCAR inquiry resulted in both teams being placed on probation for the remainder of the year. This ruse was found to have been directly caused by the pace car. Had the pace car situation for Bowyer's intentional spin not occurred, Gordon would have finished ahead of Logano by one point and Logano would have been bumped by Newman winning the race since Newman would have taken the first Wild Card. Although Logano was allowed to keep his chase berth, the field was expanded to 13 with the addition of Gordon on September 13. NASCAR chairman Brian France has always had the power to expand the chase field in exceptional circumstances, and decided to invoke it in this case. In France's view, Gordon had been put at an "unfair disadvantage" due to Penske and Front Row's collusion, as well as MWR's improper instructions to have Vickers pit. Had this not happened, France said, Gordon would have been in the chase by taking the last lock-in position, while Logano would have received one Wild Card position due to him being ahead of Truex and Newman in points, and Kasey Kahne would have taken the other Wild Card regardless of the race outcome as he had two wins entering Richmond.

2014–2016
On January 30, 2014, a new chase system resembling the playoff systems used in other major league sports was announced at Media Day.

Under the new system, the chase field was expanded to 16 drivers for the 10-race chase. The 16 drivers were chosen primarily on wins during the "regular season,” if fewer than 16 drivers won races, the remaining field was filled on the basis of regular season points. These drivers competed against each other while racing in the standard field (then 43 cars). The driver with the most points after the final 10 races was declared the champion.

This new playoff system instituted three "cuts" where drivers are eliminated from title contention as the chase progresses. In each cut the bottom four drivers are eliminated from title contention after the third race after a cut.  After the first cut (Dover) in what was called the "Challenger Round", the field was reduced to 12. The bottom four winless drivers kept their points after the first cut, while the remaining 12 chase drivers' points are reset to 3,000 points. After three more races, the cut line eliminated the bottom four winless drivers after the sixth chase race (Talladega) in the "Contender Round", reducing the size of the field another 33%. Drivers who missed the second cut had their points reset to their score at the end of the first cut, plus the combined points accumulated in the three races in the "Contender Round." Those who continued have their points all reset to 4,000. Then the "Eliminator Round" involved axing 50% of the chase grid with the final cut, cutting the new bottom four drivers after the penultimate race at Phoenix, leaving the top four drivers to have their point totals reset to 5,000 so that they are tied for the final race at Homestead-Miami for the title run. The drivers who missed the cut after this round have their score reset to the score at the end of the first cut, plus total points accumulated in the six previous races. Of these four drivers who made this cut, the driver with the best absolute finish (no bonus points are involved) at Homestead was then crowned the season champion.

Under this system, any chase driver who won a race during a playoff round is automatically guaranteed a spot in the next round. Up to three drivers thus could advance to the next round of the chase through race wins, regardless of their actual points position after the final (third) race in that round. The remaining drivers to advance was determined by points.

The round names were removed starting in 2016, being changed to "round of 16,” "round of 12,” "round of 8,” and "championship 4."

To identify the drivers within the 43-car field that were still involved in each round of the chase, NASCAR designated various cosmetic changes in 2014: for these drivers, their cars' roof numbers, windshield header, front splitters, and fascia are colored yellow, and the chase logo appears on the front quarter panel.

2017

The previous championship format, renamed NASCAR Playoffs, was maintained for the 2017 season, but with changes. A revised regular-season points system was adopted, splitting races into three stages. Stages 1 and 2 are roughly 1/4 of the laps each, and stage 3 is about the last 1/2 of the race. The top 10 drivers at the end of the first two stages each race earn additional bonus points towards the championship, 10 points for the first place car down to 1 point for the 10th place car. At the end of the race, the normal championship point scheme is used to award points to the entire field. Additionally, "playoff points" are awarded during the regular season for winning stages, winning races, and finishing the regular season in the top 16 on the championship points standings. 1 playoff point for the winner of a stage, 5 playoff points plus an automatic berth into the round of 16 for the race winner. (In case there are more than 16 race winners in the season, then the top 16 in race wins move on). Also, more bonus points for Top-10 in points standings at the end of the regular season: 1st place in regular season points earns 15 playoff bonus points in addition to the points earned with race or stage wins; 2nd place earns 10 playoff points, 3rd place: 8, 4th place: 7, 5th place: 6, 6th place: 5, 7th place: 4, 8th place: 3, 9th place: 2, and 10th place: 1. Playoff points are also awarded in each playoff race, except the final race, for those drivers still competing for the championship, for winning stages and winning races.  If a driver qualifies for the championship, these playoff points will be added into their point totals after the resets for the first 3 rounds (round of 16, round of 12, round of 8). For the Championship 4 (final race), there are no bonus points involved, and the highest finishing driver of the 4 is declared the champion. This means a driver can have less regular season points than another driver, but be seeded higher due to more wins.

Kevin Harvick rule – fifth place

Adopted from 2014 onwards, on the suggestion of driver Kevin Harvick, fifth place in the season-ending standings will be determined amongst the chase drivers eliminated in each of the chase rounds during the final races.

First round elimination 
Drivers eliminated in the first round will retain their chase score (for example, a driver with one win during the season eliminated after scoring 75 points during the first round will score 2,080 points) and start the fourth race the same score after the first three races, and will accumulate points for the remainder of the season.

Missed the second or third cut 
Drivers eliminated in the second or third round will have their score reverted to the score at the end of the first round, then their individual race scores for the three (eliminated in the second round) or six races (eliminated in the third round), respectively, before their elimination from the championship contention will be combined with the score after the third race of the first round for the driver's total score.

For the final race 
After ten races, the drivers positions 5–16 will be determined by the total number of points accumulated in the ten races (bonus points will apply), without the points resets of the second or third rounds, added to the driver's base Chase score with bonuses added.  In the final race, unlike the four championship contenders who cannot score bonus points (the winner is determined by the driver who finished the best of those four), both non-playoff and playoff drivers eliminated from the championship are eligible to score all bonus points, so drivers who are contending for positions 5-16 will compete solely against each other.

2018-present
The previous championship format is maintained, but a few changes were added to the design touches on the cars involved in the playoffs. For the 2018 season, NASCAR collaborated with the Race Team Alliance and Twitter to unveil customized hashtags and emojis for the top 16 drivers entering the playoffs. Each driver will have their hashtag and emoji displayed on the sides of their cars until they are eliminated from contention. Non-playoff drivers can have their hashtags and the Twitter logo displayed on their cars. This was in effect until the fall Kansas race. From the fall Martinsville race to the fall Phoenix race, all hashtag and emoji labels were replaced with the NBC logo. At the season-ending Homestead race, all cars featured Snapcodes as part of a partnership with Snapchat.

The visual, social-media oriented gimmicks above were discontinued for 2019. For 2020, the banners of drivers in the playoffs read "Playoffs" instead of "Cup Series", while in 2021 playoff drivers have yellow windshield banners and rear spoilers. For 2023, NASCAR removed the requirement that drivers had to be at least 30th (20th for Xfinity and Truck) in the standings to be eligible for the playoffs by the way of a race victory.

Cup series tracks
The following are the ten race tracks at which the final ten NASCAR Cup Series races for the Championship. Texas Motor Speedway (Fort Worth, Texas) was added in 2005 as a result of the outcome of the Ferko lawsuit which eliminated Darlington Raceway (Darlington, South Carolina) by NASCAR. Also, by way of a 3-way track change, Talladega Superspeedway moved to a later date, Atlanta Motor Speedway moved to the Labor Day weekend date, and Auto Club Speedway moved to a later date inside the chase (starting 2009).

In 2011, as part of a substantial schedule realignment, a number of further changes occurred in the chase:
 Auto Club Speedway lost its playoff date.
 Chicagoland Speedway became host of the playoff opener. To accommodate this move, the races at Loudon, Dover, and Kansas all moved forward one week.
 Talladega and Martinsville swapped dates.

In 2012: 
 Talladega and Kansas swapped dates.

In 2013:
 Talladega and Kansas swapped the dates back.

In 2015:
 Charlotte and Kansas swapped dates.

In 2017:
 Talladega and Kansas swapped dates again.

In 2018, as part of a substantial schedule realignment, a number of further changes occurred in the playoffs:
 New Hampshire lost its playoff date. Las Vegas replaces New Hampshire as the playoff opener.
 Chicagoland race removed from the playoffs; moved back to July.
 Richmond was the second race in the playoffs.
 Charlotte race moved one week earlier and held for the first time in the infield road-course (the first playoff race on a road course).
 Dover race moved one week later, replacing the Charlotte race and becoming the first race in the second round.

In 2020, as part of a substantial schedule realignment:
 Homestead-Miami no longer hosts the final race of the season as the race date was moved to late March, ending a tradition dating back to 2002, the final race of the season is now held in Phoenix.
 Dover race removed from the playoffs; moved to late August.
 Darlington became the host of the playoff opener, the Las Vegas race became the first race of the second round.
 Bristol Motor Speedway hosted a race in the playoffs for the first time, as the Bass Pro Shops NRA Night Race (which serves as the last race of the first round) moved from late August to mid-September.
 Charlotte race was moved two weeks back, becoming the last race of the second round.
 Martinsville race was moved two weeks back, becoming the last race of the third round.

In 2021:
 Kansas and Texas swapped dates.

In 2022:
 Richmond race removed from the playoffs; moved to mid-August.
 Kansas race moved up to the second week, replacing Richmond as the second race of the first round.
 Las Vegas and Texas swapped dates.
 Homestead-Miami returns to the playoffs for the first time since 2019, becoming the second race of the third round.

Notes
 The North Carolina track was known as Lowe's Motor Speedway from 1999 to 2009. After the 2009 season, Lowe's chose not to renew its sponsorship contract, causing the track to revert to its original name of Charlotte Motor Speedway.
 The Kevin Harvick rule applies in both eliminations. Eliminated drivers' scores in the first round will continue to accumulate, while drivers eliminated in the second round will have their scores reverted to the end of the first round, in addition to all accumulated points from races in the second round, and drivers race for fifth.

Xfinity and Truck Series
On January 19, 2016, NASCAR announced the introduction of a playoff format for the Xfinity Series and the Camping World Truck Series. Both series use the same elimination formula as the NASCAR Cup Series playoffs, however, with some modifications (most notably, smaller fields, and only two rounds of elimination instead of three, due to both having seven races in their playoff formats compared to the ten in the NASCAR Cup Series playoffs). In the Truck playoffs, there are only eight drivers eligible for the title. At both elimination races, the bottom two drivers in the playoffs standings are eliminated from contention; However, on January 21, 2020, NASCAR announced that the playoff field for the truck series would expand from eight drivers to ten drivers with the bottom two being eliminated after the round of 10 and the bottom four eliminated after the round of 8. The Xfinity playoffs has twelve drivers, and the bottom four in points are eliminated at the end of each round. The rules for fifth place continue to be the same.

The visual identification introduced in 2021 in the Cup Series also apply in the lower two series, with red (in 2021)/purple (from 2022 onwards) banners, spoilers, and splitters for Xfinity Series playoff contenders, and blue for Truck Series counterparts.

Comparison of Playoff Champion vs Non-Playoff Points standings 
Ten different drivers have won the NASCAR Cup Series championship since the playoff system was implemented in 2004. Jimmie Johnson has the most championships under the playoff format with seven, while Tony Stewart, Kyle Busch, and Joey Logano are the only other drivers to win multiple championships since the system was introduced. Tyler Reddick is also the only multi-time championship in the Xfinity Series since the introduction of the system in the second-tier and Truck Series.

Below are the hypothetical champions based on only regular points standings after last season race if no playoff format had been implemented. This section is only to demonstrate the impact of the playoffs on the outcome of the championship in comparison to regular points standings. Given the ways that different formats change race strategy and therefore results, there is no way to know if these exact outcomes would have occurred. Number of times listed for non-playoff champions includes championships won before the playoffs began in 2004 while regular season champions only count winners after the playoffs began in 2004.

Cup Series
Within the Cup Series:
 Eight times, in 2005, 2006, 2009, 2012, 2013, 2017, 2019, and 2021, the Cup Playoff Champion would also be the champion based on regular points standings. 
 In three times, in 2005, 2017, and 2019, the Cup Playoff champion leads the points standings before the start of the playoffs.
 Only in two cases, in 2015 and 2016, the Cup Playoff champion wouldn't be in the Top 5 of the regular points standings.

Xfinity Series

Truck Series

Criticism

The NASCAR playoffs has been criticized as a "gimmick" to the sport and has been questioned over whether it is fair compared to not having the playoff at all. After failing to make the Championship 4 in 2020 despite winning nine races and winning the regular season title (as well as winning a fourth championship if there were no playoff), Kevin Harvick remarked that winning the NASCAR championship "aren’t like winning like Petty and Earnhardt used to win them." Matt Crafton's Truck Series title in 2019 has also been used to argue that the format can produce a winless champion despite its supposed focus on wins after 2014; on the debut year of elimination format, Ryan Newman secured his spot on that year's Championship 4 despite winning zero races, which could theoretically allow him to win that year's Cup Series title without winning a single race or just the championship race (the latter would happen in 2021 in the Xfinity Series when Daniel Hemric did so, having been winless for his entire NASCAR career with ten second place finishes). Kyle Busch's 2015 Cup Series title, and NASCAR's decision to grant him waiver preventing him from missing the playoffs, was criticized due to the fact he missed 11 races during the season due to an injury, something which would have prevented him from winning the championship in non-playoff and earlier Chase playoff points formats. Similar waivers were granted to Ryan Newman, who was out following his 2020 Daytona 500 crash and Matt Kenseth, who replaced Kyle Larson after he was released from Chip Ganassi Racing following a live streaming controversy in 2020, although both failed to qualify for that year's playoffs. Kurt Busch was also granted a similar waiver in 2022 after he was injured at the qualifying for the 2022 M&M's Fan Appreciation 400 but opted not to use the waiver.

Notes

References

External links
Monster Energy NASCAR Cup Series Chase Grid 
(2004–06) Point system explained – NASCAR.com
It's a little complicated, but it just might work  – NASCAR.com
(2007) Changes announced to points system and Chase  – NASCAR.com
New points would have affected some title races  – NASCAR.com
The Chase for the Sprint Cup 2010 overview – NASCAR-EUROPE.net

Playoffs
Playoffs
Playoffs
Playoffs
Playoffs
Playoffs
November sporting events
October sporting events
Recurring sporting events established in 2004
September sporting events